Charles Kellogg Field (September 4, 1873 in Montpelier, Vermont– 1948) was an American  journalist and poet. 

He served as editor of Sunset from about 1914 to 1920, after buying the magazine from the Southern Pacific Railroad along with his colleagues. He was a member of the pioneer class of Stanford University in 1895.

In 1914, Field was indicted under the Defense Secrets Act of 1911 for publishing photographs of the Panama Canal, then under construction, and its fortifications, along with an article by Lieutenant Riley Scott suggesting that the canal was vulnerable to an attack by air.

From 1927 to 1940 Field hosted a radio program on NBC called Cheerio. He also adopted this as a pseudonym, writing The Story of Cheerio, by Himself in 1936.

See also
Robert G. Fowler, pilot of Panama flight
John W. Preston, prosecutor of Panama Canal case
The Panama and the Canal from an Aeroplane (1914)

References 

1873 births
1948 deaths
American male journalists
Poets from California
People from Montpelier, Vermont
Date of death missing
Place of death missing
20th-century American journalists
American magazine editors
20th-century American criminals
Stanford University alumni
American radio hosts